Sheila Malcolmson (born March 26, 1966) is a Canadian politician who has served as the Member of the Legislative Assembly of British Columbia for the electoral district of Nanaimo since January 30, 2019. She was previously the federal Member of Parliament for Nanaimo-Ladysmith from 2015 to 2019.

She won a by-election to succeed Leonard Krog as MLA for Nanaimo on January 30, 2019. Krog, who had held the seat since 2005, resigned after being elected mayor of Nanaimo in the October 20, 2018 municipal elections. Her by-election victory allowed the minority government of NDP Premier John Horgan to maintain its working majority with the Greens in the British Columbia legislature over the opposition Liberals. On July 26, 2019 she was appointed Parliamentary Secretary for the Environment by Premier John Horgan.

Prior to her election to Parliament, she was the chair of the Islands Trust Council, and also served as the trustee for Gabriola Island.

Electoral record

Provincial elections

Federal elections

References

 

Living people
British Columbia New Democratic Party MLAs
Members of the House of Commons of Canada from British Columbia
New Democratic Party MPs
Women members of the House of Commons of Canada
Women in British Columbia politics
21st-century Canadian politicians
1966 births
21st-century Canadian women politicians